Apple Grove is an unincorporated community located in McDowell County, West Virginia, United States. Apple Grove is located along West Virginia Route 80 on the Dry Fork, south of Iaeger.

Apple Grove is on the Norfolk Southern Railway(former Norfolk and Western) network.

References 

Unincorporated communities in McDowell County, West Virginia
Unincorporated communities in West Virginia